Alexandra Miryec Muñoz Lurita (born August 16, 1992) is a Peruvian volleyball player who has represented her country at the 2010 Youth Olympics where she helped her team win a Bronze Medal. She is currently the starting setter for the Peru national team.

Career

2009
Alexandra made her debut with the Peru U18 team at the 2009 Youth World Championship, her team finished in 6th place, the best result for any Peruvian team since 1993. Alexandra along with most of her teammates gained fame after the tournament.

2010
Alexandra signed with Peruvian volleyball club Divino Maestro for the 2010-11 season.

Later that year she participated at the 2010 South America Volleyball Championship U20 winning the Silver Medal. Her team also won the Bronze Medal at the 2010 Youth Olympic Games.

2011
Alexandra helped her club, Divino Mestro, win the 2010-11 season of the Peruvian volleyball league

Alexandra played with her National Junior Team at the U-20 Pan-American Cup, held in her country, Peru. Her team won the Gold Medal and Alexandra was named "Best Setter" of the tournament, she also won the "Best Server" award.

She also participated with her team in the 2011 Women's Junior World Championship which has held in Peru, her team finished in 6th place.

Right after the Junior World Championship, Alexandra joined Peru's senior team for the 2011 World Grand Prix.

Alexandra represented her country at the 2011 Pan American Games, as of that tournament, Alexandra is the starting setter for the team.

Clubs
  Divino Maestro (2010–2012)
  CV Universidad Cesar Vallejo (2013–2014)

Awards

Individuals
 2011 Junior Pan-American Cup "Best Setter"
 2011 Junior Pan-American Cup "Best Server"
 2012 Copa Latina "Best Setter"
 2012 Copa Latina "Best Server"
 2016 Pan-American Cup "Best Setter"

National Team

Senior Team
 2013 Bolivarian Games –  Gold Medal
 2011 South American Championship –  Bronze Medal
 2013 South American Championship –  Bronze Medal

Junior Team
 2010 Junior South American Championship –  Silver Medal
 2010 Youth Olympic Games –  Bronze Medal
 2011 Junior Pan-American Cup –  Gold Medal

Clubs
 2010-11 Liga Nacional Superior de Voleibol –  Champion with Divino Maestro

References

External links
 FIVB Profile

1992 births
Living people
Volleyball players at the 2010 Summer Youth Olympics
Volleyball players at the 2015 Pan American Games
Pan American Games competitors for Peru
Peruvian women's volleyball players
21st-century Peruvian women